The 10th IAAF World Cup in Athletics was an international track and field sporting event, held under the auspices of the International Association of Athletics Federations, which took place on 16 and 17 September 2006 at the Olympic Stadium in Athens, Greece.

Teams
The teams that took part in the competition were:

Overall points table

Men

Women

Medal summary

Men

Women

External links
 2006 IAAF World cup
 IAAF homepage

IAAF Continental Cup
World Cup
IAAF World Cup
Sports competitions in Athens
International athletics competitions hosted by Greece
Athletics in Athens